The 2006 China Baseball League season saw the Tianjin Lions defeat the Guangdong Leopards in 3 games to win the Championship Series.

References

China Baseball League